The Silver Lake Bank in Montrose, Pennsylvania is a building from 1816. It was listed on the National Register of Historic Places in 1975.  It is now used as the headquarters for the Center for Anti-Slavery Studies nonprofit organization.

References

Commercial buildings on the National Register of Historic Places in Pennsylvania
Greek Revival architecture in Pennsylvania
Commercial buildings completed in 1816
Buildings and structures in Susquehanna County, Pennsylvania
1816 establishments in Pennsylvania
National Register of Historic Places in Susquehanna County, Pennsylvania